Microcaecilia pricei is a species of caecilian in the family Siphonopidae. It is endemic to Colombia. Its natural habitats are subtropical or tropical moist lowland forests, subtropical or tropical moist montane forests, pastureland, plantations, rural gardens, heavily degraded former forest, and irrigated land.

References

pricei
Amphibians of Colombia
Endemic fauna of Colombia
Amphibians described in 1944
Taxonomy articles created by Polbot